The 2010 BWF World Championships was the 18th tournament of the World Badminton Championships, a global tournament in the sport of badminton. It was held at Stade Pierre de Coubertin in Paris, France, from August 23 to August 29, 2010. Originally the competition is to be held at Palais Omnisports de Paris-Bercy but it was moved to Stade Pierre de Coubertin due to financial issues.

Host city selection
Australia, France, South Korea, and other nations submitted bids to host the championships. France was later announced as the host for the championships.

Draw
The draw took place on 9 August 2010 in Kuala Lumpur, Malaysia.

Medalists

Medal table

Events

Logo plagiarism controversy
In August-2013, Brazilian news portals reported that the competition logo had been plagiarized by a company named Telexfree which became operational only in 2011, two years after Badminton World Federation (logo owner) and Taïo Design Consulting (logo creator) launched the official brand for 2010 BWF World Championships. Because of this issue, Telexfree have decided to execute a re-brand campaign without giving any official explanations about the case or if there is any legal action moved by the logo owner.

References

External links

Official website
BWF World Championships 2010 at tournamentsoftware.com

 
BWF World Championships
BWF World Championships
World Championships
Badminton tournaments in France
BWF World
2010 in Paris
August 2010 sports events in France